Harold Jaffe (born July 8, 1942) is an American writer of novels, short fiction, drama, and essays. He is the author of 30 books, including 14 collections of fiction, four novels, and two volumes of essays. He is also the editor of the literary-cultural journal Fiction International. He has won two NEA grants in fiction and two Fulbright fellowships. His works have been translated into 15 languages, including German, Japanese, Spanish, Italian, French, Turkish, Dutch, Czech, and Serbo-Croatian. Jaffe is also a Professor of Creative Writing, English, and Comparative Literature at San Diego State University.

Jaffe's fiction has appeared in such journals as Mississippi Review; City Lights Review; Paris Review; New Directions in Prose and Poetry; Chicago Review; Chelsea; Fiction; Central Park; Witness; Black Ice; Minnesota Review; Boundary 2; ACM; Black Warrior Review; Cream City Review; Two Girls’ Review; and New Novel Review. His fictions have also been anthologized in Pushcart Prize; Best American Stories; Best of American Humor; Storming the Reality Studio; American Made; Avant Pop: Fiction for a Daydreaming Nation; After Yesterday's Crash: The Avant-Pop Anthology; Bateria and Am Lit (Germany); Borderlands (Mexico); Praz (Italy); Positive (Japan); and elsewhere.

The 2004 issue of The Journal of Experimental Fiction called “The Literary Terrorism of Harold Jaffe” was devoted to his writings.

Jaffe is well known for his technique of docufiction, a literary form that treats and fictionalizes news reports and other published data to expose their philosophical underpinnings, ambiguities, nuances, and hidden agendas. In addition to Docufiction, both Guerilla Writing and Unsituated Dialogue were literary terms Jaffe created..

Works

Novels
 Mole's Pitty (1979)
 Dos Indios (1983)
 Othello Blues (1996)
 Jesus Coyote (2008)
 Brando Bleeds (2022)

Docufiction collections
 Son of Sam (2001)
 False Positive (2002)
 Nazis, Sharks & Serial Killers (2003)
 15 Serial Killers (2003)
 Terror-Dot-Gov (2005)
 Paris 60 (2010)
 Anti-Twitter (2010)
 OD (2012)
 Induced Coma (2014)
 Death Cafe (2015)
 Goosestep (2016) 
 Sacred Outcast (2017)
 Porn-anti-Porn (2019)
 Brut: Writings on Art & Artists (2021)
 Performances for the End of Time (2022)

Fiction collections
 Mourning Crazy Horse (1982)
 Beasts (1986)
 Madonna and Other Spectacles (1988)
 Eros Anti-Eros (1990)
 Straight Razor (1995)
 Sex for the Millennium (1999)
 Strange Fruit & Other Plays (2021)
 Sacrifice (2022)

Essay collections
 Beyond the Techno-Cave: A Guerrilla Writer’s Guide to Post-Millennial Culture (2006)
 Revolutionary Brain (2012)

References

External links
 Jaffe's Wordpress site
 Jaffe's faculty page at SDSU

American magazine editors
1938 births
Living people
American academics of English literature
San Diego State University faculty
American male essayists
American male novelists
American male short story writers
20th-century American male writers
21st-century American male writers
20th-century American essayists
21st-century American essayists
20th-century American novelists
21st-century American novelists
20th-century American short story writers
21st-century American short story writers
Grinnell College alumni
New York University alumni